The 2014 IMSA Continental Tire Sports Car Challenge was the fifteenth season of the showroom stock series and the first under the International Motor Sports Association sanctioning body after the Grand American Road Racing Association's Rolex Sports Car Series was merged with IMSA's American Le Mans Series. The series remained unaffected aside from the addition of IMSA to the beginning of its name.

In the Grand Sport class, Fall-Line Motorsports pairing Trent Hindman and John Edwards won two races during the season, but due to Edwards not completing a mandatory period behind the wheel at Kansas Speedway, Hindman was crowned sole champion by 15 points ahead of Edwards. Stevenson Motorsports drivers Andrew Davis and Robin Liddell were next in the championship, finishing just one point behind Edwards, despite winning one more race than the Fall-Line team. TRG-AMR North America's Kris Wilson was the only other driver to win multiple races; he won at Kansas with James Davison, while he also won at Virginia International Raceway, sharing with Max Riddle. Other teams to win races were the second Fall-Line team of Shelby Blackstock and Ashley Freiberg, Rum Bum Racing pairing Nick Longhi and Matt Plumb, Matt Bell and Andy Lally for Stevenson Motorsports, CKS Autosport's Lawson Aschenbach and Eric Curran, while the season finale was won by Multimatic Motorsports with drivers Ian James and Billy Johnson.

In Street Tuner, there was a solo champion like in the Grand Sport class. Murillo Racing's Eric Foss and Jeff Mosing competed for the majority of the season together – with two wins at Daytona and Virginia International Raceway – but Mosing missed the Laguna Seca event due to back spasms. Thus, Foss won the championship by eight points ahead of Team Sahlen driver Wayne Nonnamaker, who did not win a race but finished in second place on four occasions. Mosing finished in third place in the championship, a further three points in arrears. The most wins were taken by Compass360 Racing pairing Ryan Eversley and Kyle Gimple, who won three races during the season – including the last two races – but their other performances were only good enough for ninth in the drivers' championship. Randy Pobst and Andrew Carbonell took back-to-back victories for Freedom Autosport at Sebring and Laguna Seca, while other race victories were taken by Chad Gilsinger and Michael Valiante at Kansas, Canadian duo Remo Ruscitti and Adam Isman on home soil at Canadian Tire Motorsport Park, Cody Ellsworth and Corey Lewis at Indianapolis Motor Speedway and Terry Borcheller and Mike LaMarra at Road America. A second Freedom Autosport car was able to win at Lime Rock, when Tom Long shared a car with Liam Dwyer – a staff sergeant with the United States Marines – who was racing with a prosthesis on his left leg after losing it when he stepped on a land mine in Afghanistan, three years prior.

Schedule

Official test sessions

Two official test sessions were scheduled:
January 3–5 – Daytona International Speedway
February 20–21 – Sebring International Raceway

Race schedule

A twelve-round schedule was announced on October 11, 2013.

Results

Notes

News

Compass 360 Racing announced that they were entering Subaru WRXs in Grand Sport alongside their street tuner Honda Civic Si's.

References

2014
Continental Tire Sports Car Challenge